The Serbia women's national under-19 volleyball team represents Serbia in international women's volleyball competitions and friendly matches under the age 19 and it is ruled by the Serbian Volleyball Federation That is an affiliate of Federation of International Volleyball FIVB and also a part of European Volleyball Confederation CEV.

History

Results

FIVB U19 World Championship
 Champions   Runners up   Third place   Fourth place

Europe U18 / U17 Championship
 Champions   Runners up   Third place   Fourth place

Team

Current squad
The following is the Serbian roster in the 2015 FIVB Volleyball Girls' U18 World Championship.

Head Coach: Jovo Caković

References

External links
 Official website 

National women's under-18 volleyball teams
under